Jeffrey R. Long is a professor of Chemistry at University of California, Berkeley known for his work in metal−organic frameworks and molecular magnetism. He was elected to the American Academy of Arts and Sciences in 2019 and is the 2019 F. Albert Cotton Award recipient. His research interests include: synthesis of inorganic clusters and porous materials, investigating the electronic and magnetic properties of inorganic materials; metal-organic frameworks, and gas storage/capture.

Early life and education 
Jeffrey Long was born in Rolla, Missouri on May 15, 1969. He is the son of Gary J. Long, Prof. Emeritus of Chemistry at the Missouri University of Science and Technology, an expert in Mössbauer spectroscopy.  He received his Bachelors of Arts from Cornell University in Chemistry (summa cum laude) and Mathematics (cum laude) in 1991. While an undergraduate student, he worked alongside Prof. Roald Hoffmann on the application of molecular orbital theory in determining solid-state band structure of metal carbides. He went on to do graduate studies with Prof. Richard H. Holm at Harvard University where he studied the structure and electronic properties of transition metal chalcogenide clusters, earning his PhD in 1995. After continuing with Richard Holm as a postdoctoral fellow, in 1996 he then went on to do post-doctoral studies with Prof. Paul Alivisatos at the University of California, Berkeley.

Independent career 
Long began his independent career at the University of California, Berkeley in 1997, where he expanded his work to include studies on Prussian blue analogs and metal cyanide coordination clusters with emphasis on their magnetic properties. He has contributed significantly to the field of molecular magnetism, most notably in the synthesis and characterization of a linear cobalt(II) complex exhibiting a non-Aufbau ground state, the characterization of radical-bridged lanthanide single-molecule magnets (SMMs),  and the isolation of atomically defined 2-D metal-halide sheets within a porous material. In the mid 2000s the focus of his research shifted towards the emergent field of Metal-Organic Frameworks (MOFs). His initial studies were focused on hydrogen storage in open-metal site manganese MOFs. His other notable works in this field include the synthesis and characterization of novel frameworks for hydrocarbon separations, the discovery of a novel cooperative mechanism for carbon dioxide capture, as well as the discovery of materials for other industrially relevant chemical separations.,

References 

Living people
American chemists
University of California, Berkeley faculty
Cornell University alumni
Harvard University alumni
Inorganic chemists
UC Berkeley College of Chemistry faculty
Fellows of the American Academy of Arts and Sciences
1969 births
Solid state chemists